Lorenz Park is a census-designated place (CDP) in Columbia County, New York, United States. The population was 2,053 at the 2010 census.

Geography
Lorenz Park is located in the north part of the town of Greenport at  (42.263667, -73.765705). It is bordered to the south by the city of Hudson (the county seat) and to the north by Stottville. It is bordered on the west by the Hudson River and on the east by Claverack Creek, a tributary. U.S. Route 9 passes through the community, leading south into Hudson and north to Stockport and Kinderhook.

Demographics

As of the census of 2000, there were 1,981 people, 868 households, and 543 families residing in the CDP. The population density was 1,074.3 per square mile (415.7/km2). There were 903 housing units at an average density of 489.7/sq mi (189.5/km2). The racial makeup of the CDP was 91.52% White, 4.69% African American, 0.20% Native American, 0.76% Asian, 1.06% from other races, and 1.77% from two or more races. Hispanic or Latino of any race were 4.14% of the population.

There were 868 households, out of which 27.8% had children under the age of 18 living with them, 45.6% were married couples living together, 13.2% had a female householder with no husband present, and 37.4% were non-families. 32.4% of all households were made up of individuals, and 20.9% had someone living alone who was 65 years of age or older. The average household size was 2.27 and the average family size was 2.88.

In the CDP, the population was spread out, with 22.7% under the age of 18, 5.5% from 18 to 24, 26.5% from 25 to 44, 22.8% from 45 to 64, and 22.5% who were 65 years of age or older. The median age was 41 years. For every 100 females, there were 86.4 males. For every 100 females age 18 and over, there were 77.4 males.

The median income for a household in the CDP was $33,958, and the median income for a family was $46,371. Males had a median income of $34,667 versus $25,000 for females. The per capita income for the CDP was $16,859. About 5.2% of families and 9.1% of the population were below the poverty line, including 11.9% of those under age 18 and 4.0% of those age 65 or over.

References

Census-designated places in New York (state)
Census-designated places in Columbia County, New York
New York (state) populated places on the Hudson River